Cryan is an Irish surname anglicised from the Gaelic, Ó Croidheáin "descendant of Croidheán". Notable people with the name include:

 Carmel Cryan (born 1949), British actress
 Colin Cryan (fl. 2000s), Irish footballer
 John Cryan (born 1960), British banker
 John F. Cryan (1929–2005), American politician 
 Joseph Cryan (born 1961), American politician
 Robert Cryan (1827–1881), Irish physician and educator
 Walter Cryan (born 1932), Radio personality from Rhode Island

Surnames of Irish origin